The Marnes d’Auzas Formation (Auzas marls) is a geological Formation in southwestern France (departments of Ariège and Haute-Garonne) whose strata date back to the Late Maastrichtian. It is about 100 metres thick and consists primarily of marls with some interbeds of sandstones. It corresponds to sediments whose depositional environment evolved from the paralic domain (coastal lagoons, tidal marsh, tidal muddy channel) at the base of the formation, towards a more continental domain (alluvial plain, fluvial channels) in its upper part. The Marnes d’Auzas Formation was deposited in the west coast of the former Ibero-Armorican Island, which included much of France and Spain.

Vertebrate paleofauna

 Theropods:
 Theropoda indet. (a medium-sized form only known by a tooth)
 Dromaeosauridae indet. 
 Hadrosaurs:
 Canardia garonnensis 
 Lambeosaurinae indet.
 Sauropods:
 Titanosauria indet. (compared to the Ibero-Armorican titanosaurs from the Campanian and early Maastrichtian times, the teeth of this form are more like those of Atsinganosaurus than those of Ampelosaurus or Lirainosaurus.
 Bird:
 Enantiornithes indet.
 Mammals:
 Theria indet.
 Pterosaurs:
 Azhdarchidae indet. (only known by a very large cervical vertebra suggesting an individual with a wing-span of 9 m) 
 Turtle:
 Iberoccitanemys convenarum
 ? Foxemys sp.
 Squamata:
 Mosasauroidea indet. (only known by a vertebra first attributed to a Varanoidea, would actually be a freshwater mosasaur)
 ? Amphisbaenia indet.
 cf. Teiidae indet.
 Crocodylia:
 Thoracosaurus neocesariensis (according to Christopher Brochu, the species from the Marnes d'Auzas represents a distinct taxon from T. neocesariensis)
 cf. Musturzabalsuchus sp.
 Amphibia:
 Albanerpetontidae indet.
 Anura indet.
 ? Urodela indet.
 Fish:
 Palaeogaleus sp.
 Rhinobatos sp.
 Rhombodus binkhorsti
 Coupatezia sp.
 cf. Pycnodus sp.
 Lepisosteidae indet.
 Phyllodontidae indet.
 Sparidae indet.

See also 
 List of dinosaur-bearing rock formations

References

Geologic formations of France
Maastrichtian Stage